Carpatho-Rusyn American was a magazine of the culture and history of Rusyn speaking peoples and their descendants in the United States and Europe. The magazine was published between 1976 and 1996. It was headquartered in Fairfax, Virginia.

References

External links
 WorldCat

Quarterly magazines published in the United States
Cultural magazines published in the United States
Defunct magazines published in the United States
Magazines established in 1976
Magazines disestablished in 1996
Magazines published in Virginia
Rusyn-American history
Rusyn culture